Sigma Nu Phi was a professional law fraternity and a member of the Professional Fraternity Association.

History
Sigma Nu Phi was founded in 1903 at National University School of Law. In 1916, Sigma Nu Phi started publishing The Owl.

Delta Theta Phi merged with Sigma Nu Phi in 1989, taking all of Sigma Nu Phi members into membership and gaining its The Adelphia Law Journal, giving Delta Theta Phi its own authoritatively recognized law review.

Chapters
Chapters were named for Distinguished Lawyers. These included: 
1903-1943. Joseph H. Choate Alpha, National University Law School
1910-1944. Charles Evans Hughes Beta, Georgetown Law School 
1916-1944. William Howard Taft Gamma, Detroit College of Law 
1916-1940. Nathan Green Delta, Cumberland University 
1917-1941. Gavin Craig Epsilon, University of Southern California
1921-1940. Jefferson Davis Zeta, University of Richmond
1921. John Marshall Eta, Stetson University
1922. Oliver Wendell Holmes Theta, Washington College of Law of American University
1922-1943. Champ Clark Iota, St. Louis 
1922-1946. James G. Jenkins Kappa, Marquette University Law
1923-1935. Richmond Pearson Lambda, Trinity College (now Duke University
1923. Russell H. Conwell Mu, Temple University School of Law
1923-1940. William D. Mitchell (Nu) 
1924-1943. Stephen A. Douglas (Xi) Loyola University, Chicago, 111 
1925-1940. Edward Douglas White (Omicron) Loyola University, New Orleans, La. 
1926. John F. Shafroth (Pi) Westminster College of Law, Denver, Colo. 
1926. William Marvin Simmons (Rho) University of California, San Francisco, Cal. 
1927. Sir Charles Hibbert Tupper (Sigma) Vancouver Law School, Vancouver, B. C. 
1927. Leon P. Lewis (Tau) University of Louisville, Louisville, Ky. 
1927. John W. Davis (Upsilon) Duquesne University, Pittsburgh, Pa. 
1928. Grant Fellows (Phi) Detroit City Law School, Detroit, Mich. 
1929. Alexander H. Stephens (Chi) Atlanta Law School, Atlanta, Ga.
1936. Robert S. Bean (Psi) Northwestern College of Law
1938. John H. Reagan (Omega) Law School, University of Texas
. James Madison (Alpha Alpha) Dept of Law University of Virginia
1975. H.A. Blackmun (Alpha Beta) Hamline Law School, St. Paul, MN
1980. Howard J. Munson (Alpha Eta) Syracuse
1980. Orville Richardson (Alpha Epsilon) St. Louis
1980. Roscoe Pound (Alpha Zeta) Nebraska
1981. Marion Griffith (Alpha Theta) Vanderbilt
1982. Allen D. Vestal Iowa
1982. Louis D. Brandeis (Alpha Beta) Cal Western Law

References

Defunct fraternities and sororities
Student organizations established in 1903
1903 establishments in Washington, D.C.
Former members of Professional Fraternity Association